Evarts Greene Loomis (1910–2003) was an internationally known physician, surgeon, author, lecturer, and visionary who is regarded by some as "the father of holistic medicine," Loomis  preferred to be called Evarts rather than "doctor".

Origins of holistic approach

He was inspired to conceptualize holistic medicine while a young doctor working for the Grenfell Mission, which served the fisherman families of Newfoundland and Labrador, traveling by dog sled and boat when necessary. "It was out of the ethers, or perhaps from God, that the words 'Treat the whole man, treat the whole man,' kept flashing through my mind, and they have been with me ever since. For the next eighteen years, I gave much thought as to the practical application of a therapy that would include the physical, mental, and spiritual aspects of illness." Because Evarts grew up in a spiritual, humanitarian, and global environment, he was already naturally applying these concepts at the medical mission. He used prayer and meditation, in particular, in conjunction with his mother Amy and later with other spiritual healers.

Several other factors also contributed to his holistic world view. While working in this northern climate, Evarts had gained extensive surgical experience and was accepted as a fellow in the American College of Surgeons. While he loved surgery, he felt it was too limiting and chose instead to follow a career in family practice, which included surgery, and he became a fellow in the American College of Family Physicians. As an undergraduate at Haverford College, a Quaker school, Evarts read Holism and Evolution 1 by Jan Christiaan Smuts, a South African statesman and soldier. This book also influenced his tendency toward holism. In addition, he was deeply impressed by his philosophy professor, the well-known Quaker mystic Rufus Jones, founder of the American Friends Service Committee.

Early career
It was at Haverford that Evarts as a third-year biology major happened to pick up a pamphlet about the career of Albert Schweitzer, whose life was dedicated to ameliorating the suffering of natives who had no access to skilled medical care. Evarts was taken by his concepts of "welt-anschauung" (world view) and "reverence for life." That night, he picked up a phone and informed his parents that he was shifting to pre-med.

World War II intervened before Evarts could begin pioneering a therapy of the whole person. The "bamboo curtain" also cut off the dream of Evarts and his wife Verna, an RN, to become medical missionaries in China. Evarts wanted his war service to focus on saving lives, and he served as a surgeon with the United Nations Relief and Rehabilitation Association in Algeria. Bored by a lack of surgical cases, he requested and was assigned by the Friends Ambulance Unit (Quaker) to the bombed-out city of Tenchung, China. There, in a converted ancestor worship temple, he directed a hospital and clinic and, along with an international medical team, treated civilians, as well as Chinese and American military personnel.

After two years, the Quakers turned over the work to the Chinese, and Evarts returned home to his wife and young daughter Margaret, both of whom came into his life while in Newfoundland. Since they had fallen in love with the state while studying Chinese at Berkeley, Verna had already arranged for Evarts to practice in Montebello, California, where their second daughter Laura was added to the family. Evarts also knew he needed a place where new ideas would be more accepted than in the more conservative parts of the US.

Move to California
While in China, he was impressed with the way the buildings fit into the landscape, and he was already familiar with the healing power of nature. He had seen in his mind a sanitarium located below a triangular mountain peak, and he and Verna began to search for a beautiful setting for their healing center. In 1952, they felt guided to purchase Friendly Hills Ranch in Hemet, California, beneath the spectacular - and triangular - Tahquitz Peak. They began inviting patients to their home for group discussions about what was going on in those patients' lives that might be contributing factors toward illness. They also began forming a non-profit foundation and a board of directors.

Lacking money to construct a center, they eventually purchased Meadowlark, a property once owned by movie magnate Louis B. Mayer. In 1958, America's first holistic medical live-in retreat welcomed its first guest. The following year, Evarts inaugurated a series of three groundbreaking inter-professional conferences to explore the nature of the healing process. Those invited included physicians, psychiatrists, psychologists, ministers, scientists, sociologists, business people, an artist, and a spiritual healer. In 1960, Evarts and his family made a trip around the world in search of teachers and advisors to guide his visionary work, since he could find few in the states with whom he could talk about holistic medicine. Twelve years later, he began a major shift from administering drugs to practicing holistic medicine, and in 1973 he inaugurated a preceptorship program for medical students.

Meadowlark

At Meadowlark, Evarts and his staff avoided white coats so they would be indistinguishable from the guests, who stayed an average of two weeks. During the 33 years of operation, Evarts developed a basic treatment program, with the key modality being love. After a thorough medical examination, guests were given nutritional counseling and were encouraged to participate in an exercise program that might include swimming, walking, jogging, or bicycle riding. Guests were served primarily vegetarian food, much of which was grown in an organic garden on the grounds using the biodynamic principles developed by Rudolf Steiner.

In addition to psycho-spiritual counseling, guests could participate in art and music therapy, classes on yoga and meditation, acupuncture treatments, bodywork, biofeedback training, and therapeutic fasts, all of which could lead to a deeper understanding of illness and healing. A favorite activity was the daily group-therapy session where dreams, journaling, and all other modalities were brought together and shared. Guests could always retreat to the interdenominational chapel at any time of the day or night or listen to inspirational tapes in the privacy of their rooms. Meditation was extremely popular, as was the meditation teacher, Amy Loomis, who inspired guests until the age of 98, and still does today through the 52 meditation tapes she created. "Spirit is where the energy flows, and all the modalities we used at Meadowlark encouraged this healing flow of energy," said Evarts.

Bringing exercise to the Meadowlark Program was natural for Evarts, having developed an early interest in birding and hiking. In order to fit in an hour of exercise while studying at Cornell Medical School, he would walk from his aunt and uncle's apartment across New York City's Central Park, while memorizing poetry from such works as Walt Whitman's Leaves of Grass. 2 As Evarts began to develop his exercise program, he combined elements from Thomas Cureton's Physical Fitness and Dynamic Health 3 (particularly the Standard Test of Physical Fitness), the Royal Canadian Air Force Plans for Physical Fitness,4 and Dr Kenneth Coopers's Aerobics.

Evarts was well-grounded in the physical aspects of medicine while studying and training at Cornell, as well as a brief consideration of the new field of psychiatry. On his trip around the world, he visited the Bircher-Benner Hospital and Clinic in Zurich, which influenced his ideas about nutrition and the role of fasting in healing. Evarts also visited Max Bircher, the son of the founder of the famous Bircher-Benner institution. There, at the Landhaus Murpfli, he discovered a model for Meadowlark and expanded his concept of whole-person therapy. Evarts found fasting to be the best method for detoxification in the overall treatment of chronic illness, which was often associated with ingested and environmental toxins. "Frequently the people who came in with chronic illnesses had been to many other doctors and had exhausted all possibilities of healing, as well as their money. We never charged what it cost to operate Meadowlark and always had to raise funds," said Evarts.

American Holistic Medical Association
In 1977, doctors C. Norman Shealy, Gladys Taylor McGarey, Bill McGarey, and Gerald Looney gathered at Meadowlark to lay the foundation for the American Holistic Medical Association (AHMA), which led to the first conference held the following year in Denver, Colorado. Evarts remembers discussions about the spelling of holistic. "Was it to be with a 'w' or an 'h'? We decided on the 'h', since it is derived from the Anglo-Saxon word 'hal', which is the root of health, whole, holy, and heal, and is thus more inclusive."

At the time of Meadowlark's 25th anniversary celebration in 1983, Dr. Shealy, founding president of AHMA, designated Evarts as the "father (and grandfather) of holistic medicine" and stated that Meadowlark had served as a role model for most of the people in the holistic movement. In 1995, Evarts received the AHMA Pioneer Award, which recognizes outstanding contributors to the holistic health movement. Previous recipients include Dr Linus Pauling and Bill Moyers. Evarts is also a founding diplomate of the American Board of Holistic Medicine (ABHM), which offered its first exam in conjunction with the University of Colorado Medical School in 2000. Evarts, with Rev. J. Sig Paulson, authored one of the first books on holistic medicine, Healing for Everyone: Medicine of the Whole Person6, a classic work on the art of medicine, which is in its second paperback reprinting. He also wrote a biography of his mother and most important spiritual teacher, entitled Amy, The Search for the Treasure Within 7 and published excerpts from her manuscript "Lessons for the Aquarian Age" under the title, To Self Be True 8. In addition to writing books and articles, Evarts filmed many of the European teachers he met on his world trip. His film, Healing the Whole Person 9, includes the only images of the "father of psychosynthesis," Roberto Assagioli, MD.

Later life

As executive director of Meadowlark, Evarts and his staff treated more than 6,000 guests before finishing his pioneering work in 1991. The overall program had considerable success in treating arthritis, cancer, and other chronic illnesses. For many years, Evarts was also a tireless international lecturer. He spoke at the first meeting of the British Holistic Medical Association, and while he and his wife Fay Loomis, MA, were lecturing in Calcutta, India, they were asked to help inaugurate the Indian Holistic Medical Association. Evarts and Fay were married in 1992, after Verna's death. Holding an MD, FACS, FACP, and ABHM, Evarts has served on several boards, been interviewed on radio and television, and received numerous honors. His most recent honor occurred at the 25th Silver Anniversary of the AHMA when 25 medical pioneers were recognized, including doctors Deepak Chopra, Larry Dossey, Christiane Northrup, Rachel Naomi Remen, and Bernie Siegel.

Today Evarts and Fay jointly counsel, write, and lecture. As Evarts recently approached his 93rd birthday, he expressed his gratefulness at being able to influence and witness a therapy of the whole person (body, mind, and spirit), which has gone through the pains of birth and adolescence and found its fruition in a specialty board-the ABHM. Evarts has summarized his life experiences and his vision for the future of medicine in his forthcoming book, "Return of the Priest-Physician: Medicine for the 21st Century" (Loomis, EG, to be published).

Legacy
Holistic practitioners, authors of books on holistic modalities, and those who have benefited from holistic treatment are all indebted to Evarts' unwavering pioneering spirit, his vision of holism, and his ability to synthesize it into a working model. For several years he sometimes struggled alone, in spite of occasional criticism from traditional medicine, to provide a template which is now rivaling mainstream medicine. Perhaps most important of all, he has lived the model that he created.[reference...?]

"No one I know or know about so truly deserves to be termed 'pioneer' in this movement," said Willis Harmon, late president of the Institute of Noetic Sciences. "When I first met Dr Loomis in the late 1950s, he had just started Meadowlark, and his philosophy and practice of holism impressed me as applying not only to medicine, but to all of life. Very few people at that time could foresee the revolution against reductionism, fractionalism, and positivism that began in the 1960s. Evarts not only saw the issues clearly, but created an influential demonstration of what the new way would mean in terms of 'health for the whole person.'"

Evarts G Loomis's great-grandmother was Mary Evarts, was a sister of former United States Secretary of State, Attorney General and Senator William Maxwell Evarts.

References

1. Smuts, J C. Holism and Evolution. New York, NY: The Macmillan Co; 1926.
2. Whitman, W. Leaves of Grass. New York, NY: Doubleday, Doran & Co., Inc; 1940.
3. Cureton, T. Physical Fitness and Dynamic Health. New York, NY: Dial Press; 1965.
4. "The Royal Canadian Air Force Plans for Physical Fitness." This Week Magazine. 1962.
5. Cooper, K. Aerobics. Philadelphia, PA and New York, NY: Lippincott; 1968.
6. Loomis, E G. and Paulson, J. Healing for Everyone: Medicine of the Whole Person. Marina del Rey, CA: DeVorss & Company; 1975.
7. Loomis, E G. Amy, The Search for the Treasure Within. Marina del Rey, CA: DeVorss & Company; 1986.
8. Loomis, E G. To Self Be True. Hemet, CA: Friendly Hills Fellowship; 1991.
9. Loomis, E G. Healing the Whole Person. A Ray Garner Film, 1973.

Sources

Integrative Medicine: A Clinician's Journal, October/November 2002, Vol. 2, No. 5.

1910 births
2003 deaths
Haverford College alumni
Weill Cornell Medical College alumni